Ramil Yuldashev (born September 5, 1961 in Ufa, Bashkir ASSR) is a retired Ukrainian ice hockey winger who played the majority of his career in the Soviet Championship League with Salavat Yulayev Ufa and Sokil Kyiv. He led the league in scoring in 1990–91 with 36 goals and 56 points in 46 games. He played four games for the Soviet Union in 1990 and then played later for Ukraine. He was named best forward at the 1993 C Pool World Championships and was the highest goal scorer at the 1994 C Pool World Championships.

Career statistics

Regular season and playoffs

International

External links

1961 births
Sportspeople from Ufa
Soviet ice hockey right wingers
Ukrainian ice hockey right wingers
Living people
Salavat Yulaev Ufa players
EHC Biel players
Bolzano HC players
Gothiques d'Amiens players
Expatriate ice hockey players in Russia
Sokil Kyiv players